Kokila is a 1937 Hindi social family drama film directed by Sarvottam Badami. The music was composed by Anil Biswas  with lyrics written by Siddiqui and Zia Sarhadi. The story was adapted from the well-known novel Kokila, written by Gujarati writer Ramanlal Vasantlal Desai. The film starred Motilal, Sabita Devi, Shobhna Samarth, Maya Bannerjee, Sitara Devi, Pesi Patel, Siddiqui and Kayam Ali.

Cast
 Motilal
 Sabita Devi
 Shobhna Samarth
 Sitara Devi
 Sankata Prasad
 Maya Bannerjee
 Pesi Patel
 Kayam Ali
 Siddiqui

Review and Box Office
The film was not a success with Baburao Patel of Filmindia in his December 1937 editorial claiming it had "failed rather badly".
However, it had a large audience attendance in the first week and that according to Patel was due to Sabita Devi. The screenplay was considered a poor adaptation of the story. Patel  was critical of Motilal and Siddiqui's performances while praising Maya Bannerjee and Sankatha Prasad for their efforts. Shobhna Samarth had made her entry in films through Nigah-e-Nafrat (1935), but came into prominence with her roles in films like Do Diwane (1936) and Kokila.

Music
The music was composed by Anil Biswas with lyrics by Siddiqui and Zia Sarhadi  The singers were Sabita Devi, Maya Bannerjee, Anil Biswas and Dattaram Kadam.

Song List

References

External links

1937 films
1930s Hindi-language films
Indian drama films
1937 drama films
Indian black-and-white films
Films directed by Sarvottam Badami
Hindi-language drama films